Sir William Davidson, 1st Baronet of Curriehill (Dundee, 1614/5 – Edinburgh, c. 1689) was a Scottish tradesman in Amsterdam, an agent and a spy for the King and a member of his Privy Council.

Life
Nothing is known about his youth and ancestors, but he settled in Holland after 1640 and traded in the Baltic region. In 1645 he married Geertruid Schuring and stated that he was 29. In 1648 he appointed Anthony van Leeuwenhoek as an assistant. Van Leeuwenhoek stayed six years in his service. Davidson lived and worked in Warmoesstraat, close to the Oude Kerk.

During the English Civil War he choose the side of the Stuarts. In 1652 his wife died. He remarried Geertruid van Dueren who died in 1658. In those years he was living on Nieuwe Waalseiland, close to the harbour and selling wine in Stockholm.

In May 1660 he went to see Charles II in the Hague on his way to England.
In July 1660 Mary Stuart lived in his house on Herengracht, to settle an agreement with the Amsterdam burgomasters on the education of her grandson William III of Orange, only ten years old. In February he had married Elisabeth Klenck, a sister of Johannes Klencke, who presented at an unknown occasion the Klencke Atlas to the King.

In 1662 he was appointed as the King's agent in Amsterdam; he was already knighted as a baronet by Charles II of England and in 1661 as the conservator of the staple in Veere. In 1664, during the Second Dutch War he moved to Hamburg. In 1666 he was involved in a salt company in Denmark, together with Cort Adeler.

From 1664 he mined for iron at Mostadmark in Malvik, east of Trondheim with a permission for 20 years from Frederik III of Denmark and Hannibal Sehested (governor) of Norway. Davidson started to invest heavily in ironworks from 1656, placed Alexander Wishart from Edinburg there as the boss and director of the production in 1658. He was involved in a sawing mill and the production of tar.

In 1666 he sold his ironworks to his brother-in-law :nl:Coenraad van Klenck, as well as his part in the salt company. In 1667 he lived in Edinburgh. Davidson intermediated between Charles II and Johan de Witt. 

In 1668 he tried to move the staple from Veere, a Dutch town with a large Scottish population to Dordrecht. In 1668 he became Lord of Curriehill. In 1672 he was involved in the tobacco trade on Virginia.

On 14 October 1670 he was allowed to start mining for copper in Klaebu, south of Trondheim, according to a letter from King Christian IV of Denmark. He started Ulrichsdal Mining Company, and build a melting-cabin at Hyttefossen in Klaebu. He went broke and in 1675 he was gone from Trondheim. Davidson spent the remaining of his life in settling legal battles against a host of complaints from Trondheim civic and mercantile society.

In an unknown year, but after 1678, when he made his will in Amsterdam, he settled in Scotland. Four children Bernard (1648-), Elisabeth (1651-), Catharina Geertrui (1663-), Agnes (1666-) inherited; Catharina his Indonesian silver, and the portraits of his parents-in-law. Not much is known about his cabinet of curiosities and lacquerware cupboard and boxes.

References

Scottish merchants
People from Dundee
17th-century Scottish people
17th-century Scottish businesspeople
Scottish spies
Scottish diplomats
Cavaliers
Scottish knights
Scottish expatriates in the Netherlands
Baronets in the Baronetage of Nova Scotia
1610s births
1680s deaths
17th-century spies